This is a list of Tulsa Golden Hurricane football players in the NFL Draft.

Key

Selections

References

Tulsa

Tulsa Golden Hurricane NFL Draft